Jefferson Allen McMahan (born August 30, 1954) is an American moral philosopher. He has been White's Professor of Moral Philosophy at the University of Oxford since 2014.

Education and career
McMahan completed a B.A. degree in English literature at the University of the South (Sewanee). He completed a second B.A. in Philosophy, Politics, and Economics, then did graduate work in philosophy at Corpus Christi College, Oxford as a Rhodes Scholar. He then earned his M.A. at the University of Oxford. He was offered a research studentship at St. John's College, Cambridge from 1979 to 1983. He studied first under Jonathan Glover and Derek Parfit at the University of Oxford and was later supervised by Bernard Williams at  the University of Cambridge, where he was a research fellow of St. John's College from 1983 to 1986. He received his doctorate in 1986 from Cambridge. His thesis title was Problems of Population Theory.

He taught at the University of Illinois, Urbana-Champaign (1986–2003) and at Rutgers University (2003–2014).

He was elected a Fellow of the American Academy of Arts & Sciences in 2022.

Philosophical work

Bioethics

McMahan has written extensively on normative and applied ethics, especially on bioethics and just war theory. His main work in bioethics includes The Ethics of Killing: Problems at the Margins of Life (Oxford University Press, 2002). The book consists of five parts, about identity, death, killing, the beginning of life, and the end of life. In its first part, McMahan defends a mixed view of personal identity, claiming that individuals are what he calls "embodied minds". In the following parts, he claims that the badness of death and the wrongness of killing depends on our interest in living. He also defends what he calls a "time-relative interest account of living". According to his view, our interest in living depends on our psychological connection to our future selves at each time.

Animal ethics

In relation to his contributions in bioethics, McMahan has also written on the subject of animal ethics, where he has argued against the moral relevance of species membership. McMahan has also claimed that intensive animal farming is a major ethical problem. He has argued for a strong negative duty to stop the suffering inflicted on animals through modern industrial agriculture and against the eating of animals. He has also participated in the ethical debate on wild animal suffering. He has additionally made a case for intervening in nature to alleviate the suffering of wild animals when doing so would not cause more harm than good.

Just war theory
McMahan's main contributions to just war theory are made in his book Killing in War (OUP, 2009), which argues against foundational elements of the traditional basis of just war theory. Against Michael Walzer, he claims that those who fight an unjust war can never meet the requirements of jus in bello.

Other work
McMahan has also co-edited the books The Morality of Nationalism (with Robert McKim, OUP, 1997) and Ethics and Humanity (with Ann Davis and Richard Keshen, OUP, 2010). In the early 1980s, he wrote two books about the political situation at the time: British Nuclear Weapons: For and Against (London: Junction Books, 1981, with a preface by Bernard Williams) and Reagan and the World: Imperial Policy in the New Cold War (London: Pluto Press, 1984). In more recent times, he has also done work on effective altruism.
He is on the editorial board of The Journal of Controversial Ideas.

Selected publications

Articles

Books
 The Ethics of Killing: Problems at the Margins of Life (Oxford University Press, 2002)
 Killing in War (Oxford University Press, 2009)
 The Ethics of Killing: Self-Defense, War, and Punishment (Oxford University Press, 2020)

See also
 American philosophy
 List of American philosophers

References

External links

 Unjust War in Iraq. The Pelican Record XLI, no. 5 (December 2004): 21-33.
  Introduction to the work of Jeff McMahan. By Lucia Sommer.
 Jeff McMahan on Killing in War. An interview for Philosophy Bites, November 21, 2009.
 

1954 births
Living people
20th-century American philosophers
21st-century American philosophers
Alumni of Corpus Christi College, Oxford
Alumni of St John's College, Cambridge
American animal welfare scholars
American ethicists
Animal ethicists
American political philosophers
Bioethicists
Sewanee: The University of the South alumni
White's Professors of Moral Philosophy